This is a list of the National Register of Historic Places listings in Navarro County, Texas.

This is intended to be a complete list of properties and districts listed on the National Register of Historic Places in Navarro County, Texas. There are three districts and three individual properties listed on the National Register in the county. Two individually listed properties are designated as both State Antiquities Landmarks and Recorded Texas Historic Landmarks. Two districts contain several more Recorded Texas Historic Landmarks.

Current listings

The locations of National Register properties and districts may be seen in a mapping service provided.

|}

See also

National Register of Historic Places listings in Texas
Recorded Texas Historic Landmarks in Navarro County

References

External links

Navarro County, Texas
Navarro County
Buildings and structures in Navarro County, Texas